Edgar García (1 January 1960 – 21 November 2020) more commonly known as El Dandy, was a Colombian bullfighter. 

Born in Zarzal, Colombia, he took the alternative on 22 January 1995 in the bullring of Manizales, Colombia being godfather  and witness . He confirmed the alternative on 29 December 2002 in Plaza de Toros México from the hands of Mexican bullfighter  as godfather and Jorge Mora as his witness.

He also dedicated himself to calling festivals so that marginalized young people could participate alongside him so that they could show their bullfighting arts.

During COVID-19 pandemic in Colombia, he was in his wild cattle ranching in the Colombian city of Cartago when he began to have symptoms of COVID-19, being admitted to the Pereira hospital where he was intubated after testing positive. He died from the disease on 21 November 2020, at the age of 60.

References

2020 deaths
Sportspeople from Valle del Cauca Department
Colombian bullfighters
Deaths from the COVID-19 pandemic in Colombia
21st-century Colombian people